CooA is a heme-containing transcription factor that responds to the presence of carbon monoxide. This protein forms homodimers and is a homolog of cAMP receptor protein.  CooA regulates the expression of carbon monoxide dehydrogenase, an enzyme that catalyzes the oxidation of CO to CO2. The most well-studied CooA homolog comes from Rhodospirillum rubrum (RrCooA), but the CooA homolog from Carboxydothermus hydrogenoformans (ChCooA) has been studied as well. The main distinction between these two CooA homologs is the ferric heme coordination. For RrCooA, the ferric heme iron is bound to a cysteine and the amine of the N-terminal proline, while, in the ferrous state, a ligand switch occurs where a nearby histidine displaces the thiolate.  For ChCooA, the heme iron is ligated by a histidine and the N-terminal amine in both the ferric and ferrous states. For both homologs, CO displaces the amine ligand and activates the protein to bind to its target DNA sequence. Several structures of CooA exist: RrCooA in the ferrous state (1FT9), ChCooA in the ferrous, imidazole-bound state (2FMY), and ChCooA in the ferrous, CO-bound state (2HKX).

References

Gene expression
Protein families
 
DNA
Gaseous signaling molecules